"Drift Off to Dream" is a song co-written and recorded by American country music artist Travis Tritt.  It was released in January 1991 as the fifth and final single from his debut album  Country Club.  It peaked at number 3 in the United States, while it became his third number-one hit in Canada.  The song was written by Tritt and Stewart Harris.

Content
"Drift Off to Dream" is a mid-tempo waltz. It begins with the male narrator, alone in a bar, thinking about a lover whom he would like to meet. He imagines holding hands with her on a blanket in the yard and kissing until she "drift[s] off to dream" in his arms.

Music video
The music video was directed by Sherman Halsey.

Personnel
The following musicians perform on this track:
Sam Bacco – suspended cymbal, percussion
Mike Brignardello – bass guitar
Larry Byrom – acoustic guitar
Jerry Douglas – Dobro
Dana McVicker – background vocals
Edgar Meyer – arco bass
Mark O'Connor – fiddle 
Bobby Ogdin – piano
Steve Turner – drums, percussion
Billy Joe Walker Jr. – acoustic guitar
Terri Williams – background vocals
Reggie Young – electric guitar

Chart positions

Year-end charts

References

1989 songs
Travis Tritt songs
1991 singles
Songs written by Travis Tritt
Music videos directed by Sherman Halsey
Warner Records singles
Songs written by Stewart Harris